Mládzovo is a village and municipality in the Poltár District in the Banská Bystrica Region of Slovakia. 
In the village is local library, foodstuff store and inhabitants are connected to gas network.

References

External links
 
 
Mládzovo information
Satellite map of Mládzovo

Villages and municipalities in Poltár District